Cantonese Bopomofo, or Cantonese Phonetic Symbols is an extended set of Bopomofo characters used to transcribe Yue Chinese and, specifically, its prestige Cantonese dialect. It was first introduced in early 1930s, and then standardized in 1950. It fell into disuse along with the original Bopomofo for Mandarin Chinese in the late 1950s.

History 
The first system of phonetic characters for Cantonese was introduced in "Phonetic vocabulary of Cantonese characters for instruction of literacy to the people", 1931, by Ziu Ngaating. His system became a basis for the modern one, accepted in 1950 by the Guangdong Culture and Education department. In 1932, however, a different system was published in a draft by the Commission on the Unification of Pronunciation with supplementary symbols for non-Mandarin Sinitic languages, including Cantonese.

Symbols 
Bopomofo for Cantonese contains additional characters to denote its specific sounds.

Combined rhymes 
The original Bopomofo was based on a two vowel model of Mandarin phonology, it contains two sets of vowel signs, one for the /a/-nucleus and another one for the /ə/ nucleus. These characters were inherited, with /a/ set used to denote long  of Cantonese, and /ə/ set for short . For the rhymes not found in Mandarin, Cantonese Bopomofo implements digraphs composed of a vowel character and a final consonants character. The monographs are highlighted in bold in the following table .

Notes:

1 Final   does not occur by itself.

Tonal Marks 
Tones can be left unmarked, but if necessary, you may mark them like in the table below.

References 
 Ziu Ngaating (趙雅庭), "Phonetic dictionary of Cantonese characters for instruction of literacy to the people" 《民眾識字粵語拼音字彙》, Guangzhou, 1931
 Commission on the Unification of Pronunciation (國語統一籌備委員會), "General table of phonetic characters" 《注音符號總表》, Beiping, 1932
 Guangdong People's government, Culture and Education department (廣東省人民政府文敎廳), "Literacy course for Guangdong peasants" 《廣州音農民速成識字課本》, Guangzhou, 1952
 Guangdong People's government, Culture and Education department (廣東省人民政府文敎廳), "Literacy course for Guangdong workers" 《廣州音職工速成識字課本》, Guangzhou, 1952
 Chinese script reform research committee secretariat, transcription program working group (中國文字改革研究委員會秘書處拼音方案工作組), "Comparative list of the country's major dialect" 《全國主要方言區方音對照表》, Beijing, 1954
 Fung Tinlip (馮田獵), "Cantonese Homophone Characters Dictionary" 《粵語同音字典》, Hong Kong, 1974

Mandarin words and phrases
Auxiliary and educational artificial scripts
Ruby characters
Writing systems derived from the Chinese
Transcription of Chinese
Han character input